Nahrkhan may refer to:
 Nahrkhan-e Olya
 Nahrkhan-e Sofla